Manon Lescaut is a short novel by Prévost.

Manon Lescaut may also refer to:
Manon Lescaut (Puccini), an 1893 opera by Giacomo Puccini
Manon Lescaut (Auber), an 1856 opera by Daniel Auber
Manon Lescaut (1914 film), film directed by Herbert Hall Winslow 
Manon Lescaut (1926 film), film directed by Arthur Robison, starring Lya De Putti
Manon Lescaut (1940 film), film directed by Carmine Gallone, starring Alida Valli and Vittorio De Sica
The Lovers of Manon Lescaut (Italian: Gli amori di Manon Lescaut),1954 film directed by Mario Costa  
Manon Lescaut (ballet), by Jean-Pierre Aumer

See also
Manon (disambiguation)